Helena is the eastern portion of Helena–West Helena, Arkansas, a city in Phillips County, Arkansas. It was founded in 1833 by Nicholas Rightor and is named after the daughter of Sylvanus Phillips, an early settler of Phillips County and the namesake of Phillips County. As of the 2000 census, this portion of the city population was 6,323. Helena was the county seat of Phillips County until January 1, 2006, when it merged its government and city limits with neighboring West Helena.

During the American Civil War, the Battle of Helena was a deadly encounter. Helena is the birthplace of many notable people including prominent African Americans and Arkansas' former senior United States senator, Blanche Lincoln. Helena is home to the longest running daily radio program in the U.S., King Biscuit Time.

From 1906 to 1946, Helena was a terminal point on the former Missouri and North Arkansas Railroad, which provided passenger and freight service to Joplin, Missouri.  After, a loss of rail service in early 2015, a successful effort was launched by the Helena-West Helena/Phillips County Port Authority to have freight service restored.  The service was restored on October 1, 2015, and two new freight customers were quickly gained.

History

Battle of Helena 

In June 1863, Confederate Commander Theophilus Holmes sought to take pressure off of Vicksburg, Mississippi, by attacking the Union-held town of Helena, Arkansas. Holmes planned and executed three different failed attacks on the town. The main attack broke through Battery C, but Union troops fended off the attackers and sealed the breach. The Confederates withdrew on July 4 of 1863. There were 1,636 Confederate casualties and 205 Union casualties.

Fort Curtis 

Fort Curtis was built in August 1862 by Union soldiers and freed slaves in Helena. For the next year, it served as a command post for the Union since it was centrally located on the Mississippi River.

Fort Curtis was not directly attacked at the Battle of Helena since the Confederacy focused its attacks on the outlying batteries. The Confederates charged Fort Curtis in their last attack, but the heavy artillery inside kept the attack from reaching the fort.

Helena built a reproduction of Fort Curtis in 2012 that is free to the public.

Geography
Helena is located at  (34.526223, −90.601377).

Demographics

As of the census of 2000, there were 6,323 people, 2,312 households, and 1,542 families residing in Helena. The racial makeup of Helena is 67.93% Black or African American, 30.59% White, 0.13% Native American, 0.60% Asian, 0.17% from other races, and 0.59% from two or more races. 0.73% of the population were Hispanic or Latino of any race.

There were 2,312 households, out of which 32.7% had children under the age of 18 living with them, 33.8% were married couples living together, 28.5% had a female householder with no husband present, and 33.3% were non-families. 30.0% of all households were made up of individuals, and 13.4% had someone living alone who was 65 years of age or older. The average household size was 2.62 and the average family size was 3.28.

In Helena, the age distribution included 32.5% of the population under the age of 18, 10.0% from 18 to 24, 22.1% from 25 to 44, 20.0% from 45 to 64, and 15.5% who were 65 years of age or older. The median age was 32 years. For every 100 females, there were 83.3 males. For every 100 females age 18 and over, there were 75.5 males.

The median income for a household in Helena is $18,662, and the median income for a family was $21,534. Males had a median income of $27,203 versus $17,250 for females. The per capita income for Helena is $13,028. About 38.4% of families and 41.4% of the population were below the poverty line, including 54.9% of those under age 18 and 24.1% of those age 65 or over.

Arts and culture

Blues
Robert Palmer noted that in the mid-1930s Helena was "the blues capital of the Delta". Among the musicians who regularly visited and performed in the area at that time were Robert Johnson, Johnny Shines, Sonny Boy Williamson II, Robert Nighthawk, Howlin' Wolf, Elmore James, David "Honeyboy" Edwards, Memphis Slim and Roosevelt Sykes.

Historic buildings
Helena, Arkansas is home to historic buildings such as the Sidney H. Horner House and the Centennial Baptist Church.  The Edwardian Inn is located on land occupied by Union forces during the Siege of Vicksburg in 1863, and is listed in the National Register of Historic Places.

Education
Helena-West Helena School District operates schools in what was Helena.

Schools in the former West Helena.
 J. F. Wahl Elementary School
 S.T.A.R.S. (Students Tapping Academic Resources for Success) Academy (alternative school)

Eliza Miller Junior High School and Central High School, the designated secondary schools, were in West Helena.

Helena previously had a Catholic grade school for black children, St. Cyprian School; it closed in 1963.

Notable people
James M. Alexander, formerly enslaved African-American politician and businessperson; served in the Arkansas House of Representatives and as first African-American Justice of the Peace in Arkansas
John Hanks Alexander, first African American officer in U.S. armed forces to hold regular command position and second African American graduate of  U.S. Military Academy
Dorathy M. Allen, first woman elected to Arkansas Senate
John Allin, presiding bishop of the Episcopal Church (United States)
Bankroll Freddie, rapper 
Bruce Bennett, former Arkansas Attorney General
Joseph Robert Booker, African-American civil rights leader
Caroline Shawk Brooks, first known American sculptor to work with butter
Patrick Cleburne, Confederate General
CeDell Davis, blues guitarist and longtime recording artist despite disabled hands
William Henry Grey, Reconstruction-era politician and state senator 
Thomas Burton Hanly, Arkansas judge and legislator  
Ken Hatfield, college football coach
Thomas C. Hindman, Confederate General
Red Holloway, jazz saxophonist
Alex Johnson, baseball player, 1970 American League home run champion
Mary Lambert, film director
Blanche Lincoln, former U.S. Senator from Arkansas
Roberta Martin, gospel singer
Theodore D. McNeal, union organizer, equal employment opportunity activist, and state senator in Missouri
Elias Camp Morris, pastor of Centennial Baptist Church and president of the National Baptist Convention
Conway Twitty, country singer and actor in Country Music Hall of Fame
Ellis Valentine, former right fielder for the Montreal Expos and the New York Mets.
James T. White - Reconstruction-era politician and Baptist minister

References

Further reading
 2000 U.S. Census maps: Index and pages 1, 2, 3, and 4.
 1990 U.S. Census map of Phillips County (index map) indicates Helena on pages 4, 8, D4, D6, and E.
 History of Helena's Jewish community (from the Institute of Southern Jewish Life)

External links
 
 
 The Helena-West Helena Daily World, the newspaper serving Helena-West Helena and Phillips County
 ePodunk: Profile for Helena, Arkansas 
 City-Data.com
 

American Civil War sites
Former municipalities in Arkansas
Arkansas populated places on the Mississippi River
Populated places in Phillips County, Arkansas
Populated places established in 1833
Populated places disestablished in 2006
1833 establishments in Arkansas Territory